Stefan Edberg was the defending champion, but lost to Mats Wilander in the final 6–3, 6–7, 6–7.

Seeds
The top eight seeds received a bye to the second round.

Draw

Finals

Top half

Section 1

Section 2

Bottom half

Section 3

Section 4

References

External links
ATP main draw
ITF tournament edition details

Cincinnati Open - Men's Singles